Shandro is a surname. Notable people with the surname include:

Andrew Shandro (politician) (1886–1942), Canadian provincial legislator
Andrew Shandro (born 1971), Canadian professional mountain biker
Daryl Janet Shandro, Canadian social activist and unsuccessful candidate for Parliament, 2000
Tyler Shandro, Alberta Minister of Labour and Immigration

See also
Shandro, Alberta, community in Canada